The Bârlad is a river in eastern Romania, a left tributary of the river Siret. Its source is in the low hills between the Siret and Prut rivers, southwest of Iași. It flows generally south, through the cities of Negrești, Vaslui, Bârlad and Tecuci. The Bârlad flows through the Romanian counties of Neamț, Vaslui and Galați. It flows into the Siret near Suraia.

Tributaries

The following rivers are tributaries to the river Bârlad (from source to mouth):

Left: Bozieni, Gârboveta, Hăușei, Găureni, Sacovăț, Velna, Stavnic, Rebricea, Uncești, Telejna, Vaslui, Crasna, Albești, Idrici, Văleni, Petrișoara, Banca, Bujoreni, Zorleni, Trestiana, Jaravăț, Hobana, Bârzotel, Bârzota, Bălăneasa, Gârbovăț, Corozel

Right: Purcica, Poiana Lungă, Bârzești, Stemnic, Racova, Chițoc, Ghilăhoi, Chițcani, Pârvești, Horoiata, Simila, Valea Seacă, Tutova, Pereschiv, Lupul, Berheci, Blăneasa, Prisaca, Tecucel

References

Rivers of Romania
 
Rivers of Neamț County
Rivers of Vaslui County
Rivers of Galați County